Rear-Admiral The Hon. William Le Poer Trench (4 July 1771 – 14 August 1846) was born in Garbally, Galway, Ireland to William Power Keating Trench, 1st Earl of Clancarty and Anne Gardiner. He acted for a considerable period as the agent of the estates of his father's family in Ireland.

He was made a Lieutenant in the Royal Navy in 1793; promoted to the rank of Commander in 1799; to that of Post Captain 1802; and to that of Rear Admiral in 1840.

In 1819 he was appointed Secretary to the Board of Customs and Port Duties in Ireland.

Family
He was married twice, first on 8 March 1800 to Sarah Cuppage, daughter of John Loftus Cuppage. Sarah died in June 1834, and on 1 February 1837 William married a second time to Margaret Downing, daughter of Dawson Downing and Anne Boyd.

See also

References 

1771 births
1846 deaths
People from County Galway
People from Galway (city)
Royal Navy rear admirals
Younger sons of earls
William